W.T. Sampson Elementary/High School is a K-12 school in Guantanamo Bay Naval Base, Cuba. As of 2010, 227 (Sure Start-6th Grade) are in the elementary campus, and 104 (7-12) are on the secondary school campus.

It is operated by the Department of Defense Education Activity of the United States Department of Defense.  W.T.S. is the oldest DoDDS school.

As of 2010 currently enrolled in W.T. Sampson High School are 167 students. Students are the children of military and civilian families stationed at Naval Station Guantanamo Bay, Cuba. The school is accredited by the North Central Association of Schools and Colleges (NCA) and has held accreditation since 1931.

History
It is the oldest continually operating Department of Defense school. It opened in 1931, operated by the United States Navy. At the time, the sole staff member was Guantanamo Bay's Protestant chaplain, and the school facility was the chaplain's office. By 1932 the school had over 30 students. When a faculty was assembled, it taught elementary school on mornings and high schools in afternoons.

In 1941 the high school moved to a building on Chapel Hill.

A new W. T. Sampson School was officially dedicated on October 25, 1956. Named after Admiral W. T. Sampson, USN, a Spanish–American War naval hero who headed the U.S. Fleet that operated in the water surrounding Cuba.

During the Cuban Missile Crisis students were evacuated to the mainland United States.

In 1976 the school was incorporated into the United States Department of Defense Education Activity and was no longer directly operated by the Navy. In 1985 the high school moved to its current location.

In 2016, NAVFAC awarded a project to demolish the existing W.T. Sampson school buildings and replace with a multi-story elementary-middle-high school building that is expected to be finished by November 2018. The price per student would be $250,000, while a typical public school in Miami-Dade County, Florida would have a price of $30,000 per student. Carol Rosenberg of the Miami Herald characterized the new Sampson as "one of the world’s priciest schools". The company that built the school was Munilla Construction Management LLC, a Cuban American concern based in Miami.

Academic assessment
Students of the DODEA school system are subject to two assessment standards to measure academic performance. 

There is the TerraNova that is taken in Grades 3-11. "DoDEA students scored substantially higher than the national average (50th percentile) in all subject areas." 

The other test is the SAT. The SAT is not a required test. The participation rate of DoDEA students in 2009 was 67%. The national SAT participation rate was 46%.

TerraNova results

SAT results

Campus
Previously, the high school campus was on Chapel Hill. Chapel Hill is the location of the base church. Across from the chapel was a series of offices and classrooms that was the original location for the school from 1931 to 1986.

The prior campus was dedicated in 1986.

The school has been remodeled in recent years. The school has an Information Center, one full-size computer lab, Internet access in all classrooms, and a gymnasium.

References

External links

 W. T. Sampson School
 W.T. Sampson Elementary/High School - Guantanamo Bay Naval Base

Schools in Cuba
Guantanamo Bay Naval Base
Educational institutions established in 1931
Department of Defense Education Activity
1931 establishments in Cuba